The  is a seven-seat mini MPV produced by the Japanese automaker Honda. The first-generation Mobilio that was produced from 2001 to 2008 and sold exclusively in Japan, was the second model in Honda's "Small Max" series and also took Honda's Global Small Platform and their i-DSI engine. In May 2008, the Freed was introduced, replacing the first-generation model. The second-generation Mobilio, which is based on the Brio, was introduced in September 2013 and went on sale in January 2014 for several emerging markets.



First generation (GB1/2; 2001) 

The first-generation Mobilio was released on 21 December 2001. It is a 1.5-litre compact MPV that was designed with recreational activities in mind. It was discontinued in May 2008 following the release of the Freed.

Along with the flexible cargo configurations, there are two sliding doors, one on each side.

The Mobilio incorporates Honda's G-CON (G-force Control) technology, for enhanced crash safety. The vehicle body is designed to offer protection to occupants in a 55 km/h full-frontal collision, a 64 km/h front offset collision, 55 km/h side collision and a 50 km/h rear collision. Honda has implemented its own vehicle-to-vehicle collision testing program: 50% frontal offset collision with a 2-ton class vehicle while both vehicles traveling at 50 km/h, to help improve safety in real-world collisions. In order to enhance recyclability, almost all interior injection-molded parts are made of olefin resin. Together with other measures, it results in an overall vehicle recyclability of over 90%.

The 1.5 L VTEC engine is designed for both power and fuel economy. The Japanese Ministry of Transport recognized the Mobilio as an "excellent low emissions" vehicle. Also featured in the Mobilio is the Honda Multimatic S (CVT). It is Honda's new generation of CVT with 7-speed mode that offers three driving modes: CVT, 7-speed automatic shift mode and 7-speed manual shift mode. Four-wheel drive is also available.

Mobilio Spike 
The Mobilio Spike was released in Japan on 19 September 2002. Differences from the regular Mobilio include the C-pillar being twice as wide and an overall boxier design. It received a facelift in 2005.

Second generation (DD4/5; 2014) 

The Mobilio nameplate was revived as an MPV model based on the Brio platform, designed mainly for the Indonesian market. Developed by Honda R&D Asia Pacific, it was first unveiled as a prototype model at the 21st Indonesia International Motor Show on 19 September 2013. Production of the Mobilio began on 15 January 2014 at Honda Prospect Motor's Karawang plant and sales began on 25 January 2014 in Indonesia. Trim levels offered were S, E, E Prestige and RS (since June 2014) with either a 5-speed manual or a CVT (E, E Prestige and RS only) transmission. The second generation Mobilio is powered by either the 1.5 L L15Z1 i-VTEC petrol engine or the 1.5 L N15A1 i-DTEC diesel engine for Indian market. In the same year, the Mobilio won the Car of the Year Otomotif Award 2014 in Indonesia.

The Mobilio was also introduced into the Indian market in July 2014. In 2014, the Indian Mobilio contains over 90% local parts. It was discontinued in July 2017 due to poor sales. It was also introduced in Thailand in September 2014 and South Africa in October 2014.

The Mobilio was launched in the Philippines on 28 April 2015. All Philippine-spec Mobilios were imported from the Ayutthaya plant in Thailand. It was discontinued in June 2021 due to declining sales.

On 19 January 2016, the Mobilio received a minor change in Indonesia, which introduced an updated dashboard design carried from the BR-V.

The S trim is the base model, only available with 5-speed manual. The S does not have a rear wiper, foglights, side indicators, double blower air-conditioning, nor security system. The door handles are unpainted and it has  steel wheels. After the facelift, the Mobilio S received some additional equipment such as the double blower air conditioning system as well as alloy wheels. The mid-range E trim of the Mobilio has  alloy wheels, security system, body colour painted door handles and side mirrors that comes with indicators, and double-blower air conditioning. The Mobilio E was offered either with 5-speed manual or CVT transmission, although ABS and EBD was only available for the E-CVT models until the facelift. The Prestige trim was short-lived since it was only offered from the January 2014 launch and was replaced by the Mobilio RS in June 2014. The Prestige has chrome decorations on its fog light borders, side mouldings, license plate holder, and muffler tip. The alloy wheel design was unique to the model. The Mobilio Prestige has a Kenwood  touchscreen head unit with a reversing camera view function. Throughout production, all Mobilios has front ventilated disc brakes and rear drum brakes.

On 19 June 2014, Honda Prospect Motor Indonesia released the sportier variant, the Mobilio RS. The RS trim came with a sporty bodykit, projector headlamps with daytime running lamps, sporty  alloy wheels, silver roof garnish, full black interior, silver matte door handle, speed sensing door lock, higher quality audio, and double door insulation to reduce noise in the cabin. It was offered with new colors, with Carnelian Red Pearl and Modern Steel Metallic replacing Polished Metal Metallic. Either a 5-speed manual or a CVT transmission are offered.

Powertrain 

Petrol Mobilios are powered by the 1.5 litre 16-valve single-overhead camshaft L15Z1 unit, equipped with electronic fuel injection and i-VTEC. It has a 10.3:1 compression ratio and can run on 91 RON fuel. The Mobilio receives either a 5-speed manual transmission or a CVT transmission.

Facelift 
On 12 January 2017, the Mobilio received a facelift, featuring redesigned front fascia and an addition of thin chrome bars on the trunk. ABS and EBD became standard on all trims.

The facelifted Mobilio is available in Thailand from May 2017 and the Philippines from July 2017.

During the 26th Indonesia International Motor Show on 19 April 2018, the Mobilio E Special Edition (CVT only) was released with a unique front grille, redesigned two-tone alloy wheels, exhaust pipe finisher, an  floating touchscreen display head unit, and an armrest console.

On 21 February 2019, the Indonesian market Mobilio received another update, featuring projector headlights with LED daytime running lamps exclusive to the E and RS trims. The RS trim receives the same , two-tone alloy wheels that are optional on the N-Box Custom kei car, while the E trim received the wheels previously used on the facelifted RS trim. The S trim received the same front grille and wheels as the Mobilio E Special Edition. The  resistive touchscreen display head unit is now standard in both S and E trims. The RS trim received a shark fin antenna, smoked tail lamps, orange accent trims on the dashboard, red stitching on the seats, redesigned meter cluster with RS logo, and an  capacitive touchscreen display head unit.

In April 2022 for the Indonesian market, the E and RS trims were removed from the lineup, leaving only the S trim mainly for fleet markets. The trim's front grille and wheels were reverted to the previous design from the 2017 facelift model.

Safety 
The Mobilio for India with no airbags nor ABS received 0 stars for adult occupants and 1 star for toddlers from Global NCAP in 2016.

The Mobilio for India with 2 airbags and no ABS received 3 stars for adult occupants and 2 stars for toddlers from Global NCAP in 2016 (similar to Latin NCAP 2013).

Sales 
At the end of August 2014 year to date, Honda sold 110,457 units and increased by 78 percent from last year of the same period, the Mobilio made a debut with 59,377 sales units or about 54 percent of all Honda sales. The Mobilio became Honda's top seller in Indonesia for 2016.

References

External links 

  (Indonesia)

Mobilio
Cars introduced in 2001
2010s cars
2020s cars
Mini MPVs
Front-wheel-drive vehicles
All-wheel-drive vehicles
Global NCAP small MPVs
Vehicles with CVT transmission